Demont Creek flows from the Seneca River to Cayuga Lake by Lehigh Valley Junction, New York.

References

Rivers of Seneca County, New York
Rivers of New York (state)